Llandrillo yn Rhos is the name of an electoral ward in Conwy County Borough, Wales. Its boundaries are coterminous with those of the community of Rhos-on-Sea, on the North Wales coast, with the Mochdre and Rhiw wards to the south, Penrhyn ward to the west and Liverpool Bay to the northeast.

According to the 2011 UK Census the population of the ward was 7,593.

County elections
The ward elects four county councillors to Conwy County Borough Council and, at the May 2017 election, all four seats were won by the Welsh Conservative Party. Newly elected councillor, James Lusted, was a well-known local actor and television presenter who has dwarfism. He pledged to campaign for people with disabilities. At 43 inches tall he became the Conservative Party's shortest elected politician.

* = sitting councillor prior to the election

Town council ward
Rhos-on-sea elects town councillors to the Bay of Colwyn Town Council, but the community ward is called Rhos.

References

Rhos-on-Sea
Wards of Conwy County Borough